Fan Expo Canada is an annual speculative fiction fan convention held in Toronto, Ontario. It was founded as the Canadian National Comic Book Expo in 1995 by Hobby Star Marketing Inc. It includes distinctly branded sections, including GX (Gaming Expo) and SFX (Science Fiction Expo), and formerly CNAnime (Canadian National Anime Expo). It is a four-day event (Thursday through Sunday) typically held the weekend before Labour Day during the summer at the Metro Toronto Convention Centre (MTCC).

Originally showcasing comic books, science fiction/fantasy and film/television and related popular arts, Fan Expo Canada has expanded over the years to include a larger range of pop culture and fandom elements, such as horror, anime, manga, animation, toys, collectible card games, video games, and web entertainment. The convention is the largest of its kind in Canada and among the largest in the world, filling the entire North and South Buildings of the MTCC with over 130,000 attendees in 2016.

In 2013, Fan Expo Canada's parent company Hobby Star Marketing was acquired by Informa, which now organizes the event. The company has extended the Fan Expo brand to other conventions organized by the company in Canada and the United States.

Programming
Along with panels, seminars, and workshops with comic book professionals, there are previews of upcoming feature films, portfolio review sessions with top comic book and video game companies, and evening events such as the Masquerade (a costume contest), special screenings and the Diamond Distribution Industry Night Dinner and Reception for industry professionals only.

Traditional events include screening rooms devoted to Japanese animation, gaming, and over 300 hours of other programming on all aspects of comic books and popular culture.

Like most comic book conventions, Fan Expo Canada features a large floorspace for exhibitors. These include media companies such as movie studios and TV networks, as well as comic book dealers and collectibles merchants. Fan Expo Canada also includes a large autographs area, as well as an Artists Alley where comic book artists can sign autographs and sell or do free sketches.

Exclusive collectibles
In recent years, Fan Expo Canada has become one of the few events that provides selling "exclusive" products to attendees. The vast majority of the exclusives offered at Fan Expo Canada are licensed properties of popular movie, comic book and related characters.

History, locations, and dates

Fan Expo 2020 and 2021 were cancelled due to the COVID-19 Pandemic.

Attractions

Fan Expo Canada is the site of many unique attractions that include Exclusive Pre-screenings and live presentations of upcoming television series and feature films, often including live introductions from the Directors, Producers and Cast members. Some recent projects featured at Fan Expo Canada included the television series:
Revolution cast Billy Burke, Tracy Spiridakos and Giancarlo Esposito
Arrow cast Stephen Amell, Willa Holland, Colin Donnell and Katie Cassidy
Criminal Minds cast A. J. Cook and Matthew Gray Gubler
Flashpoint cast David Paetkau, Sergio Di Zio and Oluniké Adeliyi
entire cast for Bitten
entire casts and producers for Continuum, Dead Before Dawn and Lost Girl
Harry Potter Reunion with Tom Felton, Rupert Grint and James and Oliver Phelps

In 2012, for the first time ever, Fan Expo Canada was the site of a wedding. Two longtime Fan Expo attendees were married in front of a live audience of thousands of fans on the afternoon of August 24. There was also a proposal of marriage that took place between two attendees on the afternoon of August 26. The engaged couple credited Fan Expo Canada's Nerd Speed Dating event from the previous year in finding one another.

Some attractions at Fan Expo Canada have become standard from year to year due to their continued popularity. Some of these attractions include the aforementioned Speed Dating, Steampunk activities, Web series presentations, Star Wars sessions provided by the 501st Legion, Lolita fashion and others.

Issues
Capacity attendance at Fan Expo Canada in 2005 has raised crowding issues. Concerns have been that the event is possibly too big for the Metro Toronto Convention Centre, even though they have moved to the largest halls in the facility. The worry of fans is that the event will sell out and potential attendees will be denied entry as has happened at similar events such as Anime North, the New York Comic Con and San Diego Comic-Con International.

The 2010 event left thousands of fans standing outside as capacity became an issue, many waiting several hours for re-entry. At one point during Saturday afternoon organizers announced (to a small group by the doors) that they would not be letting anyone else in, including those who had purchased tickets in advance, but the majority of fans remained unaware of this and continued to line up in ignorance until word-of-mouth reached them. Eventually they announced that they would be staying open an extra hour to try to accommodate the lines, though many had waited for more than 2 hours for re-entry.

Due to additional space, more staff, a new advance ticketing system, expanded hours and the additional day added to the event, capacity issues were avoided in 2011.

In recent years, HSM has cleaned up their organization and become more respectful to attendees of their fan-based events. After the capacity issue at Fan Expo 2010 and extending the event, CEO and President Aman Gupta released an apology statement to the fans, and stated that while no refunds would be made under any circumstances, the South Building of the Metro Toronto Convention Centre, which had been the location in previous years, was booked immediately for the 2011 edition.  Public relations employees at Hobby Star also contacted as many of the fans who had expressed their dissatisfaction, gathering feedback on the convention and expressing personal apologies.

Criticism
Some of the negative aspects described by fans is the overpricing of the conventions, including entry fees, merchandise, autographs and poor services. Canadian journalist and book writer Jonathan Kay, who was an attender at the convention with his daughters, criticized the high prices charged to fans for photo ops and autographs, arguing them to be unjust. He gave the opinion that it was an undignified way to make a living and that "celebrity worship is the lowest common denominator in popular culture".

References

External links
 

Anime conventions in Canada
Comics conventions in Canada
Gaming conventions
Horror conventions
Multigenre conventions
Science fiction conventions in Canada
Recurring events established in 1995